This is a list of Sites of Community Importance in the Basque Autonomous Community.

See also 
 List of Sites of Community Importance in Spain

References 
 Lisf of sites of community importance in Basque Country

 List